Buenavista, officially the Municipality of Buenavista, is a 4th class municipality in the province of Marinduque, Philippines. According to the 2020 census, it has a population of 26,043 people.

History

The town was named "Buenavista" by Don Cornelio Sadiua, due to its "good view." Its former name was Sabang, which is the river that runs through it. The majority of Buenavistans trace their ancestry to the Don Cornelio Sadiua family.

In 1942, the Japanese Imperial forces landed in Buenavista at Patay Ilog before making their way to the capital. Due to its rugged terrain, relative isolation, and fierce pro-American sentiment, Buenavista was the headquarters for the resistance movement. Japanese forces and the Resistance and guerrillas frequently engaged in skirmishes within the town borders. Occupying Japanese forces burned the school and municipal building, after holding captives composed a member from each Buenavista family. Guerrilla forces eventually re-captured the town.

The 'Libas Ambush, known locally as Pinag Labanan, was a joint guerrilla-Buenavistan effort in which Filipino guerrillas and Buenavistans ambushed and killed a troop of Japanese soldiers. After which the Japanese commandant issued a proclamation that for 1 Japanese soldier killed by the Filipinos in Buenavista, 10 Filipinos will die within a 5-mile radius.

In spite of the Japanese threats the Buenavistans continued their fight against Japanese occupation throughout the war, including rescuing and hiding several the combined Filipino and American military personnel during the war. One such rescue occurred shortly after the fall of Bataan, when the lighthouse keeper found an American seaman hiding among the shoreline rocks. These rescued Filipinos and Americans were clothed, fed and hidden by the Buenavistans, even though they risked execution if the Japanese found out about it.

In 1945, the combined U.S. and Allied Philippine Commonwealth military forces landed at Caigangan beach in Buenavista and attacked from the Japanese Imperial forces in the Battle of Marinduque. The Buenavista Campaign was the first major offensive fought during the Battle of Marinduque. It culminated in a bloody firefight between the Japanese and a joint Allied- Filipino guerrilla offensive. The Japanese, who were headquartered in the Municipal building and elementary school, were soundly defeated.

Buenavista was chosen as the headquarters of the 5th Infantry Division of the Philippine Commonwealth Army and the U.S. Army Signal Corps due to their record of anti-Japanese actions during the war. The U.S. Army Signal Corps and the 5th Infantry Division of the Philippine Commonwealth Army were quartered in Pablo Pe's bodega in the town.

The longest-serving mayor was Recaredo Sarmiento. His term was interrupted during World War II. The first Chinese-Filipino mayor was Wilfredo Sadiua Pe.

Geography

Barangays
Buenavista is politically subdivided into 15 barangays.

 Bagacay
 Bagtingon
 Bicas-bicas
 Caigangan
 Daykitin
 Libas
 Malbog
 Sihi
 Timbo (Sanggulong)
 Tungib-Lipata
 Yook
 Barangay I (Poblacion)
 Barangay II (Poblacion)
 Barangay III (Poblacion)
 Barangay IV (Poblacion)

Climate

Demographics

Economy

Locally crafted products include:
 Kalamay-hati: A type of coconut jam made from coconut cream and sugar or molasses
 Maja blanca: A type of coconut pudding
 Suman: A dessert/snack made of sticky rice and coconut steamed in leaves.
 Puto: A steamed rice cake.
 Bagoong: A traditional fish paste made using fresh local/sustainable ingredients.

Tourism

 The Palengke Seaside Cultural Arts and Entertainment Pavilion: A local gathering place for Buenavista events, parties, and exhibitions.
 Malbog Hot Springs: Located in the Malbog district. These are hot sulfur springs, heated by the volcanic Mount Malindig. They reputedly have therapeutic and healing properties.
 Elephant Island (previously Isla Perro): Located off the coast of Buenavista in the shadow of Malindig. In the 1970s the island was for sale at a price of 3000 pesos. In 2009, Bellarocca Island Resort and Spa opened in this island.
 Inuman Bato (Drinking Rock): Located in Suk'an district. It is a tidal pool on the beach that is submerged in the sea during high tide. At low tide, the pool is filled with drinkable, fresh water. It was reportedly featured in the popular "Ripley's Believe It or Not!" newspaper serial during the 1950s.
 Pablo Pe's Bodega: Located on Don Cornelio Street, next to the Pe House. This humble structure served as the headquarters of the United States Army Signal Corps during the Liberation.

Events

 Santo Nino Festival: A four-day festival of food, fun and family-friendly activities and events. It is held annually in January.
 Flores de Mayo: This celebration is held yearly from May 1 through May 31. It is in honor of the Blessed Virgin Mary. The children of Buenavista give gifts of bouquets and wreaths of native flowers to the Blessed Virgin.

Government

List of former local chief executives
  Agaton Sarmiento -------  1918-1925
  Ciriaco Arevalo --------  1925-1931
  Vitaliano Salvacion ----  1931-1934
  Cesar Nepomuceno -------  1934-1937
  Jose Salvacion --------------  1934-1941
  Teofisto Jamolin ------------  1941-1944
  Jose Sarmiento --------------  1944-1945
  Jose Salvacion --------------  1945-1946
  Recaredo Sarmiento ----------  1946-1947
  Recaredo Sarmiento ----------  1947-1956
  Vitaliano Salvacion ---------  1956-1958
  Josefina Sadiwa -------------  1958-1959
  Claudio Mabunga -------------  1959-1967
  Wilfredo S. Pe --------------  1967-1972
  Wilfredo S. Pe --------------  1972-1980
  Renato S. Madrigal ----------  1980
  Ofelia S. Madrigal (OIC) -----  1980-1988
  Ofelia S. Madrigal ----------  1988-1992
  Wilfredo S. Pe --------------  1992-1995
  Ofelias S. Madrigal ---------  1995
  Russel S. Madrigal ---------- Present

Education

Tertiary

Marinduque Victorians College

Secondary
 Buenavista National High School
Buenavista National High School - Bagacay Annex
Buenavista National High School - Daykitin Annex
Buenavista National High School - Lipata-Tungib Annex
Buenavista National High School - Sihi Annex
Yook National High School

Primary

References

External links

[ Philippine Standard Geographic Code]
Philippine Census Information

Municipalities of Marinduque